The 2019 Boston Marathon was the 123rd running of the annual marathon race held in Boston, Massachusetts. It took place on April 15, 2019. The elite men's race came down to a sprint finish, which Lawrence Cherono won in 2:07:57. The elite women's race was won by Worknesh Degefa, who took an early lead and built up a large gap between herself and the other runners, in 2:23:31. The men's and women's wheelchair races were won by Daniel Romanchuk in 1:21:36 and Manuela Schär in 1:34:19, respectively.

Course
The marathon distance is officially , as sanctioned by the International Association of Athletics Federations (IAAF), now known as World Athletics. The start is in the town of Hopkinton and the first  are downhill through Ashland and into the city of Framingham. Leaving Framingham, the runners enter the town of Natick, before passing through the "Scream Tunnel" at mile 12. This area is lined by young women from the nearby Wellesley College who request kisses from runners, a tradition that has been in place for more than 100 years. At mile 15, there is a large downhill section, followed by a  climb at mile 16 crossing the Yankee Division Highway. The runners take a right turn onto Commonwealth Avenue in Newton before starting the first of the four Newton Hills.

At half a mile long and with a 3.3% percent incline, it is not especially difficult, but due to the hill being  into the race, it is still feared as the runners' legs are usually tired at this point. The course is mostly downhill to the end, and passes through Boston College before entering Cleveland Circle and Kenmore Square, where there are many spectators. The final mile has a slight incline, before it flattens off to finish on Boylston Street.

Field
The 2019 edition of the marathon included nine previous winners of the race. The elite women's race included the 2018 winner Des Linden, who had the ninth-fastest personal best in the field. Sally Kipyego, runner-up in the 2016 New York City Marathon and the 10,000 metres at the 2012 Summer Olympics also competed. The fastest woman in the field was Aselefech Mergia, who ran 2:19:31 to win the 2012 Dubai Marathon. Mergia raced alongside three other sub-2:20 runners; Edna Kiplagat, Mare Dibaba, and Worknesh Degefa. Jordan Hasay, who had been dealing with injury and had pulled out of the previous year's race the day before, returned to race. Also running were 2015 winner Caroline Rotich and 2012 winner Sharon Cherop. The field included 11 sub-2:23 runners.

The elite men's race featured 2018 winner Yuki Kawauchi. The Boston Herald listed "five men to watch": Geoffrey Kirui, winner in 2017 and whose personal best was 2:06:27, Soloman Deksisa (personal best of 2:04:40), Lawrence Cherono (personal best of 2:04:06), Lelisa Desisa, winner in 2015 and whose personal best was 2:04:45, and Hiroto Inoue (personal best of 2:06:54) who was debuting in Boston. Others who had run sub-2:05 were Sisay Lemma (best of 2:04:08) and Lemi Berhanu (best of 2:04:33). The men's wheelchair race featured four-time winner Marcel Hug and ten-time winner Ernst van Dyk, whilst the women's featured Manuela Schär, the first woman to record a sub-1:30 in Boston. Also racing were Sandra Graf, and Americans Amanda McGrory, Susannah Scaroni, and Tatyana McFadden.

The day before the race, the winners of the previous year's race spoke to a crowd in Copley Square about subjects such as their diet and the mental challenges in marathons.

Race summary

In the early morning, rain had made the conditions wet but by the start there was only some light rain which cleared away later in the day. The race began with a flyover of General Dynamics F-16 Fighting Falcons from the 104th Fighter Squadron. In the men's race, Inoue and Kawauchi went to the front of the lead pack early on and, following a series of sub-5 minute miles, the group of 25 passed  in 30:20. The lead pack didn't "get really serious about hard racing" until they had passed through Wellesley. The group had further reduced to three by mile 24; Cherono, Desisa, and Kenneth Kipkemoi. With  to go, Kipkemoi increased the pace. Then with  left, Desisa made a surge before Cherono was able to catch up and the two sprinted down Boyleston Street. Desisa was unable to hold Cherono's pace and he dropped behind, meaning Cherono won in 2:07:57, two seconds ahead of Desisa. Kipkemoi finished third in 2:08:07, later stating that he had wanted to get away from the other runners, but they had managed to stay with him. The gap between the top two runners was the closest since the 1988 edition.

In the women's race, Sara Hall took control early on, passing  in a "slow" time of 17:34, but Degefa overtook her about not long after. The chasing group comprised 12 runners through the halfway point, but the group began to break up in the following hills. With  left, Kiplagat made a move from the chasing group and in the 22nd mile, moved into second place and began to catch Degefa. However, despite running the fastest  split in the race (16:08 between the 35th and 40th kilometres), Kiplagat was too far from Degefa and she won in 2:23:31. Kiplagat finished second, 42 seconds back in 2:24:13 and Hasay in third, a further 67 seconds back in 2:25:20.

In the men's wheelchair race, Daniel Romanchuk passed Masazumi Soejima at mile 16 and won in 1:21:36, an American record. At 20 years old, he was the youngest winner in the history of the race and the first American since Jim Knaub won in 1993. Soejima finished second in 1:24:30 and Hug took third in 1:24:42. Romanchuk called the victory an "amazing thing to happen". In the women's race, Schär took the lead. McFadden was in sight of the leaders when she slipped on a railroad track around mile six, causing her wheelchair to flip. Schär "cruised to victory" in 1:34:19 while McFadden was able to recover lost ground, finishing in 1:41:35 to take second place, one second ahead of Madison de Rozario. The Boston Herald described Schär as "dominant" and "increasing her lead at every checkpoint".

Results

Results reported by NBC Sports and the Boston Athletic Association.

References

External links

Official website

Boston Marathon
Boston Marathon
Boston Marathon
Boston Marathon
Boston Marathon
Marathon